Jane Goodall Environmental Middle School (JGEMS) is a public charter school serving grades six through eight that focuses on environmental science and community service. It is  housed in the same building as the Oregon School for the Deaf in Salem, Oregon, and is named after English primatologist Jane Goodall. It is part of the Salem-Keizer School District.

Mission statement 
"The Jane Goodall Environmental Middle School will provide an engaging and meaningful focus for students to achieve Oregon academic standards. Through partnerships with community and governmental organizations, an integrated curriculum design and an emphasis on field-based projects, students will actively apply their knowledge and skills as they improve our local and global environments."

Curriculum 
The curriculum at JGEMS is aligned to current Oregon curriculum content standards and all courses taught in other Salem/Keizer middle schools are also taught at JGEMS. The curriculum at JGEMS consists of conservation biology, language arts, social studies, mathematics, integrated science, physical education/health education, and technology. If any student receives a F in any class before a field trip, they are not invited on that field trip.
It is also very focused on science.

School projects 
JGEMS takes on environmental restoration projects and involves students in a variety of field studies. Projects are endangered species project, Oregon silverspot butterfly, reed canary grass suppression, frog deformities, amphibian monitoring, indefinite maintenance at Pringle Creek, macroinvertebrates census, Aumsville pond restoration, Little Pudding River restoration, forest fire severity, monitoring the movement of the heavy wood debris by tides and high water events at Siletz Bay National Wildlife Refuge, forest ecology at Opal Creek Education Center, and research on the snowy plover. As of the 2011–12 school year, all the endangered species are at the Oregon Zoo.

External links 
Salem-Keizer School District

 

Education in Salem, Oregon
Public middle schools in Oregon
Jane Goodall
Charter schools in Oregon